James Framo (1922–2001) was an American psychologist and pioneer family therapist. He developed an object relations approach to intergenerational and family-of-origin therapy. He collaborated with other pioneers in the field and authored or co-authored several early and significant texts in the field of family therapy. James was born and raised in South Philadelphia and graduated from South Philadelphia High School in 1940.  The last chapter of his 1992 publication Family-of-Origin Therapy: An Intergenerational Approach provides a personal account of his own early family experiences which served as a basis for his insights into the impact of families on individuals.

Bibliography
Boszormenyi-Nagy, I. & Framo, J.L. (1965; 1985). Intensive family therapy: Theoretical and practical aspects. New York: Brunner/Mazel. 

Framo, J.L. (1970). Symptoms from a family transactional viewpoint. In N. W. Ackerman, J. Lieb, & J. K. Pearce (Eds.) Family therapy in transition. (pp. 125–171). Boston: Little & Brown.
Framo, J.L (Ed.) (1972). Family interaction: A dialogue between family researchers and family therapists. New York: Springer.
Green, R.J. & Framo, J.L. (Eds.)(1981). Family therapy: Major contributions. New York: International University Press.
Framo, J.L. (1982). Explorations in marital and family therapy: Selected papers of James L Framo. New York: Springer.
Framo, J.L. (1992). Family-of-origin therapy: An intergenerational approach. New York: Brunner/Mazel.
Framo, J.L., Weber, T. & Levine, F. (2003). Coming Home Again: A Family-of-origin Consultation. New York: Brunner/Routledge.

External links
Biography: AFTA   
In memory of James L. Framo

1922 births
2001 deaths
American family and parenting writers
20th-century American psychologists
American psychotherapists
Family therapists